Team BridgeLane is an Australian UCI Continental road cycling team based in Sydney, Australia. Team BridgeLane competes in the Australian National Road Series (NRS) as well the UCI Oceania Tour.

Team history
Established in January 2015 by Tom Petty as Mobius Future Racing, with major sponsorship from Mobius Marketing and Design Consultants principals Jane Tribe and Guy Bicknell, these days Team BridgeLane takes its name from the BridgeLane Group, an investment firm located in Sydney, Australia. The team finished 2nd overall in the 2016 National Road Series behind  and 3rd in 2017.

Outside of the NRS, the team has raced UCI events in the USA such as Tour of the Gila in 2017 and had riders represent Australia and New Zealand at World Championships on the track and the road. It has well established presence in various local racing scenes throughout Australia, as well as consistent success in State and National Open events. Several riders also compete in races in Europe and Asia throughout the year.

For the 2019 racing season,  and the Mobius BridgeLane teams merged to become "Team BridgeLane" and retained their UCI Continental licence.

Team roster

Major results

2015
 UCI Track World Championships (Team Pursuit), Alex Frame
 UCI Track World Championships (Team Pursuit), Pieter Bulling
 New South Wales Road Championships Hill Climb, Scott Bradburn
 New South Wales U19 Road Championships Criterium, Liam Magennis
 New South Wales U19 Road Championships Road Race, Liam Magennis
 New South Wales U19 Road Championships Time Trial, Liam Magennis
 Oceania U19 Continental Road Race Championships, Jackson Carman
 Oceania U19 Track Championships (Team Pursuit), Jackson Carman
 Oceania U19 Track Championships (Maddison), Jackson Carman

2016
 U19 National Time Trial Championships, James Fouché
 U19 National Road Race Championships, Robert Stannard
 Stage 6 Tour of the Great South Coast, Nick Kergozou
 Stage 7 Tour of the Great South Coast, Robert Stannard
 Oceania U19 Continental Time Trial Championships, James Fouché
 Oceania U19 Continental Road Race Championships, James Fouché
 Overall Tour of Tasmania, Ben Dyball
Stage 4, Ben Dyball
 Overall Satalyst Tour of Margaret River
  New South Wales Road Championships Hill Climb, Scott Bradburn

2018
 Gravel and Tar, Ethan Berends
 Mountain classification New Zealand Cycle Classic, Dylan Newbery
 National Championships C5 Para-cycling Road Race, Alistair Donohoe
 National Championships C5 Para-cycling Time Trial, Alistair Donohoe
 National Championships C5 Para-cycling Road Race, Alistair Donohoe

2019
 Melbourne to Warrnambool Classic,  Nick White
 Stage 3 Tour de Taiwan, Nick White
 Overall Tour of Japan, Chris Harper
Stage 2, Ayden Toovey
Stage 6, Chris Harper
 Overall Le Tour de Savoie Mont Blanc, Chris Harper
Stages 4 & 5, Chris Harper

2020
 Overall New Zealand Cycle Classic, Rylee Field
 Points classification, Jensen Plowright
Stage 3, Jensen Plowright
Stage 4, Rylee Field
 Overall Tour de Taiwan, Nick White
Stage 3, Nick White

2021 
 Teams GC Santos Festival of Cycling
 u19 National Road Race Championships, Dylan George
 Track National Championships (Elite Team Pursuit), Pat Eddy, Jensen Plowright

References

External links

 Nick Kergozou Brings Renewed Confidence into Tour of Southland
 Meet Worlds Team: James Fouche
 Meet Worlds Team: Robert Stannard
 Tom Petty and Mobius Future Racing
 Luke Brame Secures Bronze at Nationals
 Ben Dyball Wins Tour of Tasmania

UCI Continental Teams (Oceania)
Cycling teams based in Australia
Cycling teams established in 2015